The Chrysler 22 is an American trailerable sailboat that was designed by Halsey Herreshoff and first built in 1975.

Production
The design was built by Chrysler Marine in Plano, Texas, United States, from 1975 to 1978, but it is now out of production.

Design
The Chrysler 22 is a recreational keelboat, built predominantly of fiberglass, with wood trim. It has a masthead sloop rig, a raked stem, a slightly reverse transom, a pivoting internally mounted spade-type rudder controlled by a tiller and a fixed fin keel or swing keel. It displaces . The fixed keel model carries  of ballast. A tall mast was also available with a mast  higher than standard

The boat is normally fitted with a small  outboard motor for docking and maneuvering.

The design has sleeping accommodation for five people, with a double "V"-berth in the bow cabin, a straight settee berth on the starboard side of the main cabin along with a dinette table that can be lowered to provide a double berth on the port side. The optional head is a portable-type and is located under the bow cabin "V"-berth, on the port side.

For ventilation the design is equipped with a large foredeck hatch.

Operational history
The boat is supported by two active class clubs that organize racing events, the Chrysler Sailing Association and the Chrysler Sailors.

In a 2010 review Steve Henkel wrote, "...the manufacturer called this a 22-foot boat
(although in a few places we've seen 21' 7" as the LOA) with a 19-foot waterline. Just by glancing at the drawings, one can see that the LOD is only a little longer than the waterline length. We measured LOD on the drawing and got 21 2", so we're calling the boat by the length most marketers would: a 21-footer ... Best features: We noticed no special features worth mentioning. Worst features: The inboard pivoting rudder has the same problems as described for the Chrysler 20 ... a similar design. Headroom is lowest, among the comp[etition]."

In a 1995 review in Practical Sailor, writer Darrell Nicholson stated, "the Chrysler 22 is still much admired for its clean lines and good looks. The option list, as with many small boats of its day, was long: pulpits and lifelines, galley and water tank, portable cooler, outboard bracket, toilet, curtains, backstay adjuster, running lights, mainsail cover, cushions, boom vang and more. Presumably, most used boats on the market today have these 'accessories.'"

See also
List of sailing boat types

References

External links
Photo of a Chrysler 22
Photo of a Chrysler 22

Keelboats
1970s sailboat type designs
Sailing yachts
Trailer sailers
Sailboat types built by Chrysler Marine
Sailboat type designs by Halsey Herreshoff